Zhytomyr confectionery ("ZhL"), also referred to as "ALC ZhL," is a part of Confectionery Factory ZhL Group, a Ukrainian manufacturer of confectionery products.
The factory was founded in 1994. ALC ZhL is the successor of CJSC (“Zhytomyrski Lasoshchi”).

Products and Trademarks 

ZhL produces boxed sweets, chocolate bars, glazed and non-glazed sweets, chocolate snacks, chocolate wafer sweets, biscuits, wafers, fudge, cereal bars and cereal desserts in both yogurt and sugar-free products. Production capacity is more than 80,000 tons per year. Products are manufactured under four Trademarks: ZhL, Doma, Optimix and Stevix.

In 2012, ZhL was certified "Halal" a portion of its range. Zhytomyr Confectionery Factory produces a wide range of dietary products and products for children.

Export markets 

ZhL exports to 26 countries. Among them are the CIS member countries, countries EC, the Middle East, USA, China and New Zealand.

References

External links 

 

Confectionery companies of Ukraine
Ukrainian chocolate companies
Food and drink companies of the Soviet Union
Ukrainian brands